The 1986 William & Mary Tribe football team represented the College of William & Mary as an independent during the 1986 NCAA Division I-AA football season. Led by Jimmye Laycock in his seventh year as head coach, William & Mary finished the season with a record of 9–3 and ranked No. 8 in the final NCAA Division I-AA Football Committee poll. The Tribe qualified for the NCAA Division I-AA playoffs, losing to Delaware in the first round.

Schedule

References

William and Mary
William & Mary Tribe football seasons
William and Mary Indians football